Nigel Griggs (born 18 August 1949) is a musician who played bass guitar in Split Enz. He is the brother of Paul Griggs from the 1970s vocal group Guys 'n' Dolls. A professional musician since 1963, Nigel Griggs played in a number of bands, notably The Cortinas and Octopus, 1963–1971, with his brother Paul, Carmen and Steve Hillage's Khan. 

He has been playing bass since he was 14 years old, because his brother's band needed a bassist. His other hobbies include photography, sound recording and Football. 

Griggs joined Split Enz in 1977 at the same time Neil Finn did, at the recommendation of the current drummer and close friend of Griggs, Malcolm Green. Griggs stayed with the Enz until their 1984 split. After the split, he joined Enz drummer Noel Crombie, Enz keyboardist Eddie Rayner, Split Enz founder Phil Judd and the guitarist Michael den Elzen in the band Schnell Fenster.

In 1996, when Crowded House split up and released their greatest hits album Recurring Dream, frontman Neil Finn approached Griggs to put together a collection of the band's greatest live performances, to append selected copies of Recurring Dream.

In 2002, Griggs released a solo album, Sleeper, through the Split Enz fanclub, Frenz of the Enz.

Due to being a core member, he has always participated in major Split Enz's reunions. On rare occasions, or for unplanned gigs, previous Enz bassist Mike Chunn has been known to step in.

References

External links

1983 video interview with Griggs and Neil Finn

1949 births
Living people
English bass guitarists
English male guitarists
Male bass guitarists
Split Enz members
English expatriates in Australia
English rock bass guitarists
Khan (band) members
People from Hatfield, Hertfordshire